Balasaheb Shivram Bharde (1912–2006), also known as Trimbak, was an Indian independence activist, social worker, educationist and the speaker of Maharashtra Legislative Assembly. He was known for his contributions to the cooperative movement in Maharashtra as the Minister of Co-operation (1957–1962). He was associated with several social and government organizations such as Khadi Gramodhyog, Harijan Sevak Sangh and Maharashtra Gandhi Smarak Nidhi (MGSN) and served as the chairman of the first named and as the second president of the MGS Nidhi. He also chaired the Maharashtra State Khadi Board.

Born in 1912 at Shevgaon, a small village in Ahmednagar district of the Indian state of Maharashtra, he represented his native constituency at the State Legislative Assembly for two decades from 1952. The Government of India awarded him the third highest civilian honour of the Padma Bhushan, in 2001, for his contributions to society. He died on 22 November 2006 at the age of 94, in Pune, survived by his wife, five sons and a daughter. Several educational institutions and a public library in Shevgaon have been named after Bharde.

See also 
 Cooperative movement in India
 Maharashtra Legislative Assembly

References 

Recipients of the Padma Bhushan in social work
1912 births
2006 deaths
People from Ahmednagar district
Indian independence activists from Maharashtra
Social workers
20th-century Indian educational theorists
Members of the Maharashtra Legislative Assembly
Speakers of the Maharashtra Legislative Assembly
State cabinet ministers of Maharashtra
Marathi politicians
Social workers from Maharashtra